The Agusta AB.102 was an Italian helicopter produced in small numbers in the early 1960s. The aircraft was based on the mechanical components of a Bell 48 that Agusta incorporated into an all-new, streamlined fuselage. The first flight was on 3 February 1959 and the prototype was exhibited at that year's Paris Air Show in faux military colours. Only two production examples were built, operated by Elivie in a regular air service between Turin and Milan from 1961. However, the advent of turbine-powered helicopters in the 1960s soon rendered the AB.102 obsolete.

Operators

Elivie
Ministry of Defence

Specifications

See also

References

 
 

Agusta aircraft
1950s Italian civil utility aircraft
1950s Italian helicopters
Single-engined piston helicopters
Aircraft first flown in 1959